Marko Nikezić (Serbian: Марко Никезић; 13 June 1921 – 6 January 1991) was a Serbian politician. He was a Minister of Foreign Affairs of Yugoslavia and Chairman of the League of Communists of Serbia. He was dismissed in 1972 under the charge of being "anarcho-liberal".

Biography 
Nikezić was born in Belgrade. He studied at the Technical Faculty at the University of Belgrade.

He was a member of the Yugoslav Partisan army from 1941, during World War II.

After the war, he served as Yugoslav ambassador to Egypt, Czechoslovakia and the United States of America. From 1965 to 1968 he was a Minister of Foreign Affairs of Yugoslavia. In 1968 he became the Chairman of the League of Communists of Serbia. In 1972 he was dismissed from the office under the charge of being too "liberal" and "anarcho-liberal", alongside Latinka Perović and other Serbian high-officials. This event is known in Serbian history as the 'Purge of liberals'.

He died in Belgrade in 1991.

References 

1921 births
1991 deaths
Politicians from Belgrade
University of Belgrade alumni
League of Communists of Serbia politicians
Serbian people of French descent
Ambassadors of Yugoslavia to the United States
Ambassadors of Yugoslavia to Czechoslovakia
Ambassadors of Yugoslavia to Egypt
Diplomats from Belgrade